Bathybembix humboldti, common name Humboldt's margarite, is a species of sea snail, a marine gastropod mollusk in the family Eucyclidae.

Description
The size of the shell varies between 40 mm and 55 mm.

Distribution
This species occurs in the Pacific Ocean off Chile.

References

External links
 To Biodiversity Heritage Library (2 publications)
 To Encyclopedia of Life
 To USNM Invertebrate Zoology Mollusca Collection
 To World Register of Marine Species
 

humboldti
Gastropods described in 1971
Endemic fauna of Chile